Melaleuca dawsonii is a shrub in the myrtle family, Myrtaceae and is endemic to the south of Grande Terre, the main island of New Caledonia. It is one of only a few members of its genus to occur outside Australia and was formerly known as Callistemon suberosum Pancher ex Brongn. & Gris.

Description
The young growth is densely covered with silvery-grey hair which is lost as the branches mature.

The flowers are bright green or yellowish-green and are in almost spherical heads at the ends of branches which continue to grow after flowering. Flowering occurs throughout the year and is followed by fruit which are cup-shaped, slightly hairy, woody capsules.

Taxonomy and naming
Melaleuca dawsonii was first formally described as Callistemon suberosum in 1864 by Adolphe-Théodore Brongniart and Jean Antoine Arthur Gris. In 1998 it was transferred to the genus Melaleuca by Lyndley Craven and John Dawson in the journal Adansonia. The specific epithet (dawsonii) is "in honour of John Wyndham Dawson (1928–), of Wellington, New Zealand, who is an authority on the Myrtaceae of New Caledonia".

Distribution and habitat
This melaleuca occurs only in south of Grande Terre in open maquis in soils on ultramafic rock.

References

dawsonii
Myrtales of Australia
Flora of New Caledonia
Plants described in 1864
Taxa named by Lyndley Craven